A puzzle hunt (sometimes рuzzlehunt) is a puzzle game where teams compete to solve a series of puzzles. A puzzle hunt can happen at a particular location, in multiple locations, or via the Internet. In a puzzle hunt, a puzzle is usually not accompanied by direct instructions for how to solve it (although the puzzle's title and its "flavor text" will often hint at how to solve it). Puzzles may come in familiar types such as crossword puzzles, jigsaw puzzles, cryptograms, and others, but often involve an additional twist beyond the usual structures of such puzzles that solvers must discover. Other puzzles may have innovative structures whose mechanics solvers must work out from scratch. The answer to a puzzle is generally a word or phrase. Groups of puzzles in a puzzle hunt are often connected by a metapuzzle, which is a puzzle based on combining or comparing the answers of other puzzles.

Puzzle hunt events

Famous annual puzzle hunts 

the MIT Mystery Hunt (Cambridge, Massachusetts, USA),
the Melbourne University Mathematics & Statistics Society (MUMS) puzzlehunt (Melbourne, Australia),
the Sydney University Maths Society (SUMS) puzzle hunt (Sydney, Australia),
the TMOU (Brno, Czech Republic)
the Microsoft Puzzle Hunt (Redmond, Washington, USA),
the Miami Herald's Tropic Hunt (Miami, Florida, USA),
the Washington Post's Post Hunt (Washington, DC, USA),
the Gen Con Puzzle Hunt (Indianapolis, Indiana, USA),
 Mezzacotta (formerly the Canon Information Systems Research Australia Puzzle Competition) (here),
 the Galactic Puzzle Hunt,
D.A.S.H. (Different Area Same Hunt) takes place on the same day in multiple cities around the world using ClueKeeper as the interface.
 the Phish.net Quest puzzle sequence (summary here),
 the REDDOThunt (here),
 the Great Puzzle Hunt in Bellingham, WA every April

Corporate recruiting puzzle hunts 

APT Puzzle Tournament, a recruiting event on multiple campuses hosted by Applied Predictive Technologies
Google Games, a multi-part competition that usually includes logic puzzles, coding, trivia, and building challenges that utilize materials like LEGO bricks
College Puzzle Challenge (Multiple Locations, North America), hosted by Microsoft as a recruiting event on college campuses.
Palantir's Puzzle Challenge, a recruiting event on multiple campuses hosted by Palantir Technologies

Collegiate puzzle hunts 

 Puzzle Hunt, put on every semester by a student organization called PuzzleHuntCMU at Carnegie Mellon University's Pittsburgh, PA campus
VT Hunt, an annual group puzzle hunt held annually by Virginia Tech's ᚖᚌᚖ Septagram Society
Nova Quest, a campus-wide puzzle hunt organized by the Nova Quest student organization, taking place each spring at Villanova University
Puzzle Hunt, open to all students and organized by the Rice University IEEE student chapter
SUMO Puzzle Hunt, a puzzle hunt made annually by the Stanford University Mathematical Organization
UMD PuzzleHunt, a Spring puzzle hunt written by the Puzzle Club at the University of Maryland, College Park
PuzzleBang, an annual puzzle hunt held as part of the University of Illinois Urbana-Champaign Reflections | Projections student conference

Collegiate puzzle hunts (retired) 

2012-2016 Berkeley Mystery Hunt, a puzzle hunt at UC Berkeley made by The Campus League of Puzzlers
2002-2008 PuzzleCrack (University of Illinois at Urbana-Champaign, USA)

High School puzzle hunts 

 MaPP Challenge, a national event hosted on various college/university campuses that gets high school students solving puzzles inspired by recent developments in mathematical research 
 PEA Puzzle Hunt, a puzzle hunt at Phillips Exeter Academy
Puzzlepalooza, a puzzle hunt at Montgomery Blair High School in Silver Spring MD
RM Pi Day and Mole Day Puzzle Hunts, two hunts celebrating their namesake days through math and science-themed puzzles at Richard Montgomery High School, located in Rockville, MD

Non-competitive puzzle hunts 

Individuals or teams can take part in a puzzle hunt-style challenge using software such as ClueKeeper on their smartphones. An individual hunt is purchased, downloaded, and played at the player's convenience. Such hunts are typically not timed and offer no prize except the enjoyment of playing and the satisfaction of solving the challenge. Most are tied to a particular location and require walking from place to place as the puzzles are solved, but some are designed to be played at home.

Related puzzle events
 The Game (a puzzle hunt combined with a road rally)
 Microsoft Puzzle Safari (Redmond, Washington)
 Race In The City (an Amazing Race-style event in Toronto)
 Puzzled Pint (a monthly puzzle hunt aimed at beginner to intermediate teams)
 Prehistoric Puzzlehunt (an annual event at the Museum of the Earth in Ithaca, NY) www.priweb.org/puzzlehunt
 Mission Street Puzzles (San Francisco, California)
 UNR Puzzle Hunt (A self-guided puzzle hunt on the University of Nevada Reno campus)

Puzzle hunt event calendars
 Puzzle Hunt Calendar
 Puzzle Pile Event Calendar

See also
 Letterboxing
 Geocaching
 Alternate reality game
 Treasure hunt (game)
 Geohashing
 Encounter (game)
 La chouette d'or
 The Last of Sheila, a murder mystery film set at a puzzle hunt

References